The 2019 Santosh Trophy Final was a match between Services and Punjab on 21 April 2019 in Ludhiana, Punjab. The match was a culmination of the 2018–19 Santosh Trophy, the 73rd edition of the football competition contested by regional state associations and government institutions under the All India Football Federation.

Services won their sixth title by defeating Punjab 1–0.

Match

References

External links
 Santosh Trophy at All India Football Federation website.

Final
Santosh Trophy finals
Santosh Trophy Final